Witchcraft was the ninth album by the German heavy metal band Stormwitch, released in 2004. The album sees a further expansion on the new style, first shown in "Dance With The Witches", with a prominent use of keyboards that gave a much more symphonic sound. This was the last album to feature this lineup as all members except for Andy Mück have since left the band. Again, remaining the only original member.

An extract of a video for "Fallen From God" can be viewed on Stormwitch's website. It does not state whether a full version exists for viewing or not.

Track listing
 "The Sinister Child" - 4:15
 "At the Break of This Day" - 4:07
 "Fallen from God" - 5:59
 "Frankenstein's Brothers" - 4:15
 "Until the War Will End" - 3:24
 "Witchcraft" - 5:27
 "Sleeping Beauty" - 3:38
 "Puppet in a Play" - 6:03
 "The Kiss of Death" - 3:37
 "Moonfleet" - 4:22
 "Salome" - 4:02
 "The Drinking Song" - 3:12
 "Blood Lies in My Hand" (Bonus Track) - 4:59

Personnel
 Andy Mück – vocals
 Martin Winkler – guitars
 Fabian Schwarz – guitars
 Alex Schmidt – keyboards
 Dominik Schwarz – bass
 Marc Oppold – drums

2004 albums
Stormwitch albums